David Copperfield is a two-part BBC television drama adaptation of Charles Dickens's 1850 novel of the same name, adapted by Adrian Hodges. The first part was shown on Christmas Day 1999 and the second part the following day.

The production is the acting debut of Daniel Radcliffe, who would later rise to stardom as the title character of the Harry Potter film series, where he would collaborate with his David Copperfield co-stars Maggie Smith, Zoë Wanamaker, Imelda Staunton, Dawn French and Paul Whitehouse.

The series was co-produced by BBC America and Boston television station WGBH, and first aired on American television in April 2000, as a feature in the PBS series Masterpiece. It won a Peabody Award in 2000.

Production
The original adaptation was written by John Sullivan, the writer of BBC sitcom Only Fools and Horses, and would have emphasised the comic aspects of Dickens' novel. The plan was to reunite former stars David Jason and Nicholas Lyndhurst on-screen, with Jason playing Wilkins Micawber and Lyndhurst in the role of Uriah Heep.

When Sullivan disagreed with the new direction and re-allocation of the adaptation to the BBC's drama department, he left the project, and Adrian Hodges' work was used instead.  Lyndhurst remained with this production to play Uriah Heep, and the role of Micawber was taken by Bob Hoskins. Sullivan eventually moved to ITV, where in 2001 he produced a four-part series called Micawber, with Jason in the title role.

Ian McKellen, who plays Mr. Creakle in this adaptation, previously starred as the adult David Copperfield in the BBC's 1966 adaptation of the novel.

Plot

Part one
David Copperfield is a posthumous child. He was born in Blunderstone, Suffolk, three months after the death of his father, who was also called David Copperfield. On the night of David's birth, his great-aunt, Betsey Trotwood, arrives at the the Copperfield family and eagerly anticipates the birth of a baby girl. She insists that Clara Copperfield's baby must be called Betsey Trotwood Copperfield, and that she will be her godmother. However, when the delivered child turns out to be a boy, Betsey is horrified (as her previous experiences with men have all ended tragically) and storms out.

David grows up loved and cared for by Clara and their maid, Peggotty. When David turns eight, Clara meets Edward Murdstone, a stern man who takes an immediate dislike to David. Peggotty offers to take David with her to Yarmouth to visit her brother, Dan, and his family, and he accepts, forming a special bond with Dan's niece, Emily (or Little Em'ly). When they return, David sees, to his horror, that his mother has married Murdstone. Murdstone invites his equally stern, sexist sister, Jane, to live with them, and the two Murdstones quickly dominate the household with their callous personalities. Clara briefly objects to having no say in the affairs of her own house, and Murdstone responds by asserting his authority and disciplining David, while imposing a strict regime upon Clara, David and Peggotty. When Murdstone unfairly canes David for falling behind in his studies, David bites him and, as punishment, is sent to Salem House, a boarding school owned by Murdstone's unpleasant friend, Mr Creakle, who is particularly harsh towards David at Murdstone's request. David's only comfort at the school is his friendship with James Steerforth, an older student from a wealthy family, who first defends him from a gang of bullies and then helps him win the respect of other pupils.

David returns home for the holidays and finds that Murdstone has fathered a baby boy with Clara. After the holidays David returns to Salem House, where he is soon informed by Creakle that his mother and half-brother have died, and he returns home for the funeral. Peggotty is dismissed, but becomes engaged to a family friend, Mr. Barkis.

With the Murdstones now in full control of the Rookery and David's future, Murdstone takes David out of school and sends him to work in his factory in London, arranging for David to live with Wilkins Micawber, who treats David like his own son; Micawber is sent to a debtors' prison shortly afterwards. When he is released, he and his family are forced to move to Plymouth, leaving David homeless. David runs away from London to Dover, to find Betsey Trotwood in the hope that she will take him in. Eventually he finds her, and despite her reluctance to have a boy in her house, she takes him in, and writes to inform the Murdstones of his arrival. Over time, David bonds with Betsey's lodger, Mr. Dick, and Betsey herself begins to feel attachment to her great-nephew. When Edward and Jane Murdstone arrive to take David back, Betsey appoints herself David's legal guardian, giving Murdstone a verbal thrashing for their cruelty and angrily ordering him out of her house. They are not seen or heard from again.

David, now going by the first name "Trotwood" as required by Betsey, soon resumes his education at a school in Canterbury. During his time there he lodges with Betsey's friend, Mr. Wickfield, whose daughter Agnes is of a similar age to David. They grow up together as very close friends. On leaving school, David is apprenticed as a clerk to a lawyer called Mr. Spenlow. David meets Mr. Spenlow's daughter Dora and falls in love with her at first sight.

Part two
David sees Agnes at a party in London, where he also sees Uriah Heep, Mr Wickfield's clerk. David tells Agnes of his love for Dora before running into his old friend, Steerforth. Uriah tells David of his determination to marry Agnes and warns David not to tell Agnes or her father of his intentions. Soon after, David enjoys an unplanned visit with the Micawbers before visiting Steerforth at his mother's home.

David and Steerforth travel to Yarmouth, where they visit Peggotty and the ailing Mr. Barkis, going on to visit the Peggotty family. Dan, Ham, Emily and Mrs. Gummidge are still living in the boat house, and Ham is to marry Emily. Emily confides in David that she does not believe herself to be good enough for Ham, and ignores David's reassurances. David makes one final stop to visit Peggotty and informs her that he plans to marry Dora.

At David's lodgings in London, the Micawbers come for dinner and Micawber reveals that he is now working for Uriah Heep. On returning home that evening, he finds Aunt Trotwood on his doorstep, declaring that she is ruined. David and Dora agree to a secret engagement since he is now without his great aunt's financial support. David returns to Canterbury to see the Wickfields and reveals to Mr. Micawber that he suspects Heep of trying to take control of Wickfield's business. Heep declares his intention to marry Agnes, and Wickfield responds angrily. The next day, Agnes tells David that her father has apologized to Heep, on whom he is now dependent. She reluctantly accepts her potential marriage. Upon David's next visit to Mr. Spenlow, he finds that his engagement to Dora has been discovered and is not welcomed by her family. David refuses to give up Dora and tries once again to convince Mr. Spenlow of his worthiness, but discovers him dead from a heart attack.

David visits Yarmouth again after he receives a letter from Peggotty, informing that Barkis's health is deteriorating and that it is inevitable that he will die soon. Barkis eventually dies and leaves an astronomical £3,000 in his will - the interest on £1,000 to Dan Peggotty and £2,000 to Peggotty, his wife.

Ham then tells David that Emily has run off with Steerforth, who has been lodging somewhere in the area and visiting her in secret. Dan begins a search for them, which stretches to other parts of Europe. They inform Steerforth's mother and her companion, Rosa Dartle, of his disappearance; the women reply that they will not allow Steerforth to marry Emily. David learns that the late Mr Spenlow is bankrupt and comforts Dora.

David then begins to write and starts to sell his stories. He introduces Dora to Agnes, and Dora and David get married. They struggle as a young couple with getting the house in order. David becomes frustrated by Dora's inability to run a household, but decides to adapt himself to her and their marriage is finally as happy as it should have been. Dora becomes pregnant, only to suffer a miscarriage which leaves her badly weakened and bedridden.

David eventually finds Emily in a London slum where she is being confronted by Rosa Dartle. Dan Peggotty also appears on the scene and promises Emily that they can start a new life in Australia. Emily begs David to take a letter of apology to Ham, but on his arrival at Yarmouth the town is deserted, because a fierce storm is raging and a ship is in peril. Ham attempts to rescue a passenger, who turns out to be Steerforth, but both are drowned.

Back in Canterbury, Micawber reveals that he has uncovered Heep's villainous scheme which has ruined both Mr Wickfield and Betsey Trotwood. Wickfield summons the police and Heep is arrested. In thanks, Betsey Trotwood offers to pay for a fresh start for the Micawbers in Australia, but at the harbour they are faced with a policeman who has a warrant for Mr Micawber's arrest - again for unpaid debts. Betsey Trotwood pays off Micawber's debts, leaving him free to board the boat to Australia. Dan and Emily join the Micawbers on the voyage. Peggotty insists that the news of Ham's death be kept from Emily until she is strong enough to cope. Dan invites his sister to join him in Australia, but she chooses to stay in England with David and Dora. Another passenger on the ship is Heep, one of a group of convicts in chains being loaded for penal transportation.

Dora’s health is declining and then she dies with Agnes at her bedside. In his grief David disappears for three years, during which time he continues to write and has his first two books published.

On David's return to Canterbury, he realizes that he loves Agnes Wickfield. After much prodding, Agnes reveals that she has always been in love with David, and even had Dora's dying approval. They are married and within a few years have two sons. David receives a visit from Mr. Peggotty, back from Australia. He brings news that Emily has made a full recovery and that Micawber has established himself as a successful magistrate and bank manager. The story closes with the birth of David and Agnes's third child - a girl. Betsey Trotwood's wish finally comes true after some 30 years, as David decides that the baby will be christened Betsey Trotwood Copperfield, in honour of her godmother.

Cast

 Ciarán McMenamin as David Copperfield (Adult)
 Daniel Radcliffe as David Copperfield (Young)
 Emilia Fox as Clara Copperfield
 Maggie Smith as Betsey Trotwood
 Trevor Eve as Edward Murdstone
 Zoë Wanamaker as Jane Murdstone
 Pauline Quirke as Clara Peggotty
 Michael Elphick as Barkis
 Alun Armstrong as Dan Peggotty
 James Thornton as Ham Peggotty
 Patsy Byrne as Mrs Gummidge
 Aislin McGuckin as Emily (Adult)
 Laura Harling as Emily (Young)
 Ian McKellen as Mr Creakle
 Karl Johnson as Tungay
 Oliver Milburn as James Steerforth (Adult)
 Harry Lloyd as James Steerforth (Young)
 Cherie Lunghi as Mrs Steerforth
 Kenneth MacDonald as Littimer
 Bob Hoskins as Wilkins Micawber
 Imelda Staunton as Emma Micawber
 Dawn French as Mrs Crupp
 Paul Whitehouse as the Pawnbroker
 Ian McNeice as Mr. Dick
 James Grout as Mr Spenlow
 Joanna Page as Dora Spenlow
 Nicholas Lyndhurst as Uriah Heep
 Thelma Barlow as Mrs Heep
 Oliver Ford Davies as Mr Wickfield
 Amanda Ryan as Agnes Wickfield (Adult)
 Antonia Corrigan as Agnes Wickfield (Young)
 Morgane Slemp as Clara (Young)
 Clare Holman as Rosa Dartle
 Tom Wilkinson as Narrator (as old David)

 Madison Hobbs as Betsey Trotwood Copperfield (baby)

Some locations in the story
 Blunderstone is the village in Suffolk where David Copperfield is born. He lives at a house called The Rookery with his mother Clara and servant Peggotty. When Clara Copperfield marries Mr Murdstone, he moves into the house and is soon joined by his sister. Their presence turns the house into an unhappy place and David suffers particular cruelty, being sent away to Salem House boarding school after he bites Mr Murdstone during a beating. David finally leaves Blunderstone after his mother's death, when Mr Murdstone sends him to work in London.
 Yarmouth is the Norfolk seaside town where Peggotty's relatives live in a boat house with their friend Mrs Gummidge. David visits the place as a child and returns about a decade later to visit the Peggotty family. After Ham's death, Dan, Emily and Mrs Gummidge move to Australia to start a new life - something which was particularly beneficial to Emily after her relationship with Steerforth.
 Salem House is the London boarding school where David Copperfield is sent after he bites Mr Murdstone. The cruel headteacher, Mr Creakle, is a friend of Mr Murdstone and singles out David for extra torment. David leaves the school after his mother's death, when he is sent to work at Mr Murdstone's factory. His best friend at the school is an older boy called Steerforth, who first rescues him from a gang of bullies, and who he meets again as an adult.
 London first features in the story when David is sent to work in Mr Murdstone's factory. He lives with the financially troubled Mr Micawber, who served time in a debtors' prison, until the Micawbers moved to Plymouth. David then decides to go to Dover in the hope that Betsey Trotwood will take him in. London features again when David begins his working life apprenticed to a lawyer called Mr Spenlow. During his time in London, David meets Dora Spenlow - who becomes his first wife.
 Dover is the seaside town in Kent where David goes to find Betsey Trotwood after the Micawbers leave London. She agrees to take him in and he lives at the house with Betsey and her lodger Mr Dick.
 Canterbury is the city where David Copperfield resumes his education. He grows up as a lodger at the house of Mr Wickfield, Betsey's Trotwood's business manager, whose daughter Agnes eventually becomes David's second wife and mother of their three children. Also living at the house is Mr Wickfield's lurking clerk Uriah Heep, who is eventually discovered to have committed fraud against Miss Trotwood and Mr Wickfield.
 Highgate is where James Steerforth lives with his mother Mrs Steerforth and his cousin Rosa Dartle. David visits the house several times, first after he meets Steerforth for the first time since his schooldays, again when he informs Mrs Steerforth that her son has run away with Emily, and lastly when he informs Mrs Steerforth that her son had drowned at Yarmouth.

References

External links
 
 

1999 British television series debuts
1999 British television series endings
1990s British drama television series
BBC television dramas
Peabody Award-winning broadcasts
1990s British television miniseries
Costume drama television series
Films based on David Copperfield
Films directed by Simon Curtis
Television shows based on David Copperfield
English-language television shows
1999 television films
1999 films